McDowall, MacDowall or Macdowall is a surname. Notable people with the surname include:

Adrian J. McDowall, Scottish film director
Alex MacDowall (born 1991), British auto racing driver
Archibald McDowall (1841–1918), Australian surveyor
Betty McDowall, Australian actress
Bob McDowall (1939-2011), New Zealand ichthyologist
Cecilia McDowall, (born 1951), British composer
Charles McDowall (1862–1916), Australian politician
Cyndra MacDowall (born 1953), Canadian artist
David McDowall, British Army general
Day Hort MacDowall (1850–1927), politician from old Northwest Territories, Canada
Drew McDowall (born 1961), Scottish musician
Duncan MacDowall (born 1963), English former professional footballer
Frederick McDowall (1900–1975), New Zealand scientist
Iain McDowall, Scottish writer
Ian McDowall, American chief executive
Jack McDowall (1905–1969), American football player
Jai McDowall (born 1986), Scottish musician
Jamie McDowall (born 1947), English cricketer
Kenny McDowall (born 1963), Scottish footballer
Les McDowall (1912–1991), Scottish footballer and manager
Margaret McDowall (born 1936), Scottish swimmer
Rachel McDowall (born 1984), English actress
Robert Holford Macdowall Bosanquet (1841–1912), English scientist and music theorist
Robert McDowall (1821–1894), Scottish-born Australian cricketer
Roddy McDowall (1928–1998), Anglo-American actor
Rose McDowall (born 1959), Scottish musician
William MacDowall, Scottish priest and Master of Works to Mary, Queen of Scots and her mother Mary of Guise

See also
Clan Macdowall, Scottish clan
Dowall 
 McDowell (surname)